This is a list of rivers in East Timor.  The list is arranged by catchment or drainage basin from west to east, with respective tributaries indented under each larger stream's name.

Overview
East Timor has over 100 rivers originating in the highlands and discharging into the coastal zone. As the island of Timor is small and the country's topography is steep, the rivers are short and drain quickly, with fast flowing discharges.

A drainage divide trends approximately from southwest to northeast along East Timor's central mountain range; rain falling north of the divide flows northwards, and that falling to its south drains southwards.

The country has also been broadly divided into twelve 'hydrologic units', groupings of climatologically and physiographically similar and adjacent river catchments or drainage basins. Each hydrologic unit is made up of a number of rivers. In total, there are 29 main river systems in East Timor – 12 in the north and 17 in the south.

Very few of East Timor's rivers flow perennially, because the country is narrow from north to south, and has steep terrain and infrequent rain. Most of the rivers have short courses, are dry most of the year, and are not navigable. In the dry season, the ephemeral rivers often form pools of stagnant water. The south has more perennial rivers than the north because of its larger catchment areas, longer rainy season, greater rainfall and prevailing winds.

According to a Timor-Leste Water Sector Assessment and Roadmap published by The World Bank in 2018:

During periods of greater precipitation, the rivers in the south cannot accommodate the whole of their flow, and therefore overspill into coastal swamps and lagoons known as coilões.

On the north coast, most rivers are choked with nearshore gravel, and there are few deltas. The reason is that the offshore gradient, into either Ombai Strait or Wetar Strait, is very steep, with the consequence that sediment that flows offshore is deposited in deep water. On the south coast, where the offshore gradient into the Timor Sea is much gentler, deltas are common.

Many of East Timor's rivers are polluted by sewage released from homes and light industrial premises, due to a lack of basic sanitation. Additionally, the majority of the population uses river water for washing clothes, bathing and other domestic uses, and thus promotes the spread of diseases.

The people of East Timor often have no single common name for, or any single spelling of any name allocated to, a particular river. Further, an East Timorese river may change its name several times between its source and its mouth. The names set out below are therefore not necessarily authoritative, either as to the name of a river, or as to the spelling of any particular name.

North coast
Leometik River
Fatumolin River
Berita River
Loes River (Rio de Lois)
Lauveli River
Dikasbata River
Emderilua River
Gumuloa River
Dirobatelau River
Manobira River
Curiho River
Gleno River
Goumeca River
Buro River
Roumetalena River
Maurotieramata River
Aileu River
Marobo River
Manusama River
Gamerama River
Lahora River
Bapera River
Celere River
Garai River
Aiboro River
Ladibau River
Magapu River
Baluani River
Aimera River
Boroulo River
Babonasolan River
Babalai River
Bebai River (Rio de Lois) (Nunutura River) (Nunura River)
Claola River
Hatoleai River
Hatopoci River
Timoreme River
Meuculi River
Bulobo River
Matenua River
Sasso River
Laecouken River (Loilara River)
Talau River (Taipui River)
Merak River
Malibacu River
Marae River
Bahonu River
Palua River
Malukai River
Palapu River
Laklo River
Gularloa River
Carbutaeloa River
Moraeloa River
Comoro River
Bemos River
Boera River
Santana River
Erseic River
Lobain River
Aiscahe River
North Laclo River
Sumasse River
Bobo River
Coi River
Ulahu River
Lihobani River (Libania River)
Ueseic River
Hatossi River
Mutoko River
Lolun River
Aimaleum River
Noru River
Coumai River
Hatoarabau River
Marenu River (Orlaquru River)
Karama River
Daisoli River
Manufonihun River (North Laclo River)
Manolane River
Dolacuain River
Laleia River
Baunoi River
Bueana River
Sorec River
Caleuc River
Abai River
Tutoli River
Mori River
Vemasse River
Manuleiden River
Seiçal River
Cainame River
Salubada River
Cassaquiar River
Sauma River
Buihiu River
Borouai River
Lianau River
Uaimuhi River
Lequinamo River
Laivai River (Dasidara River)
Buiguira River
Raumoco River
Malailada River

South coast
Masin River
Tafara River
Maubui River
Nanamauk River
Kamanasa River
Karautun River
Nabuk River
Raiketan River
Foura River
Loumea River
Pa River (Mauzope River)
Laco River
Mola River
Fatoro River
Belulik River
Buronuno River
Sarai River
Caraulun River
Aiasa River
Sui River
Quelun River
South Laclo River
Clerec River
Marak River
Sahen River
Laniara River
Dilor River
Culacao River
Luca River
Tuco River
Cuha River
Lee River
Bebui River
Metauai River
Irabere River
Calicidere River
Oulauai River
Boro River
Veira River
Namaluto River
Tchino River
Vero River

Oecusse
Noel Besi River
Tono River
Abanal River
Kinloki River
Ekai River
Columu River

References

 GEOnet Names Server
Indonesia 1:250,000 Series T503, U.S. Army Map Service, (1954)

 
East Timor
East Timor geography-related lists